Fighting Lady is a 1935 American drama film directed by Carlos F. Borcosque and starring Peggy Shannon, Jack Mulhall and Marion Lessing. The film was a low-budget Poverty Row production, distributed in some regions by Majestic Pictures.

Synopsis
An ambitious secretary attempts to climb the social ladder by seducing a string of men.

Cast
 Peggy Shannon as Dora Hart  
 Jack Mulhall as George Davis  
 Marion Lessing as Sally Newton 
 Mary Carr as Mrs. Davis  
 Edward Woods as Jimmie Hanford  
 Edward Earle as Eugene 'Breck' Breckenridge  
 Eddie Blythe as Mrs. Hanford  
 Alice Moore as Betty Davis  
 David Hitchcock as Daniel Mason  
 John David Horsley as Arthur Sinclair

References

Bibliography
 Pitts, Michael R. Poverty Row Studios, 1929–1940: An Illustrated History of 55 Independent Film Companies, with a Filmography for Each. McFarland & Company, 2005.

External links
 

1935 films
1935 drama films
American drama films
Films directed by Carlos F. Borcosque
Majestic Pictures films
American black-and-white films
1930s English-language films
1930s American films